Gavemic U. Ary is an Indian cinematographer.

Early life and career
Gavemic was born in Thanjavur, India and grew up in Pondicherry. His birthname was Hariharan, but upon converting to Buddhism, he changed his name to Gavemic U. Ary.

He began his career in Indian film productions in the 2000s, when he started working as an Assistant Cameraman under the supervision of cinematographer Santosh Sivan.
His first film as a cinematographer was the 2012 independent film  Mastram, which followed the journey of a writer, in which he used the Arri Alexa.

Filmography

References

Sources
 
 
 
 https://m.filmfare.com/reviews/bareilly-ki-barfi-movie-review-a-quirky-comedy-that-will-leave-you-happy-23139.amp
 http://m.indiatoday.in/story/bareilly-ki-barfi-review-artificial-sweetener/1/1029264.html
 http://m.timesofindia.com/entertainment/hindi/movie-reviews/bareilly-ki-barfi/amp_movie_review/60106889.cms
 http://m.hindustantimes.com/movie-reviews/bareilly-ki-barfi-movie-review-ayushmann-khurrana-kriti-sanon-s-film-is-sweet-and-charming/story-aW0eZAOYrtWlYkS78HUXgM_amp.html
 http://www.thehindu.com/entertainment/reviews/bareilly-ki-barfi-review-romedy-of-errors/article19517103.ece/amp/
 http://m.indiatoday.in/lite/story/bareilly-ki-barfi-review-artificial-sweetener/1/1029264.html
 https://m.rediff.com/amp/movies/report/bareilly-ki-barfi-review-a-screwball-comedy-you-must-watch/20170818.htm
 http://m.navbharattimes.indiatimes.com/movie-masti/movie-review/bareilly-ki-barfi-movie-review-in-hindi/amp_moviereview/60102319.cms

1977 births
Living people
Indian Buddhists
People from Thanjavur
Cinematographers from Tamil Nadu
Tamil film cinematographers
Converts to Buddhism